"Karaoke Queen" is a song by Welsh rock group Catatonia taken from the album Equally Cursed and Blessed and inspired by the talent-TV show Stars in Their Eyes.

"Karaoke Queen" was originally intended as the follow-up single to "Dead from the Waist Down", until the record label insisted that "Londinium" be released as the second single from the album, against the band's wishes. "Karaoke Queen" was released as the third single on 1 November 1999, and entered at number 36 on the UK Singles Chart. Cerys wrote the track after a night out in Ibiza with Dai Morris of Dai's Cwtch and relates the tale of her falling off the stage while performing karaoke at Murphy's Irish Bar in San Antonio.

References

Catatonia (band) songs
Blanco y Negro Records singles
1999 singles
1999 songs